The Mbara, also known as Kumbulmara, Mitjamba, Midjamba and Kumbulara, are or were an Aboriginal Australian people of the present-day state of Queensland. They spoke the Pama–Nyungan Mbara language.

Country
Their northern limits ran to the Gregory Range and Gledswood. The western frontier was close to Saxby Downs, while their eastern boundaries were around Chudleigh Park. They were as far south as Cambridge Downs.

Notes

Citations

Sources

Aboriginal peoples of Queensland